Heart is a Melody is a live album led by saxophonist Pharoah Sanders recorded in 1982 and released on the Theresa label.

Reception

In his review for AllMusic, Scott Yanow commented: "There are some fiery moments but few surprises on this date chiefly recommended to Sanders fans".

The authors of The Penguin Guide to Jazz Recordings stated that Sanders "appears to be rethinking his strategy... turning back to standards-playing for the first time in many years," but noted that "one can't help feeling that in these years Sanders marked time musically."

Track listing
All compositions by Pharoah Sanders except as indicated
 "Olé" (John Coltrane) - 22:13    
 "On a Misty Night" (Tadd Dameron) - 7:00    
 "Heart Is a Melody of Time (Hiroko's Song)" (William S. Fischer, Pharoah Sanders) - 7:32    
 "Goin' to Africa (Highlife)" - 3:49    
 "Naima" (Coltrane) - 7:28 Bonus track on CD reissue    
 "Rise 'n' Shine" (Stephen Ballantine, Buddy DeSylva, Vincent Youmans) - 15:07 Bonus track on CD reissue

Personnel
Pharoah Sanders - tenor saxophone, vocals
William Henderson - piano
John Heard  - bass
Idris Muhammad - drums
Paul Arslanian - bells, whistle (track 4)
Andy Bey, Flame Braithwaite, Cort Cheek, Janie Cook, Mira Hadar, Deborah McGriff, Jes Muir, Kris Wyn - vocals (track 3)
William Fischer - vocal arranger and director (track 3)

References

1983 live albums
Pharoah Sanders live albums
Theresa Records live albums
Albums recorded at Keystone Korner